Iris ser. Chinenses is a series of the genus Iris, in Iris subg. Limniris.

The series was first classified by Diels in 'Die Natürlichen Pflanzenfamilien' (Edited by H. G. A. Engler and K. Prantl) in 1930.
It was further expanded by Lawrence in  Gentes Herb (written in Dutch) in 1953.

Most species come from East Asia with flattish (looking) flowers. The species in this series are similar in form to small forms of Iris ser. Sibiricae.
Species in the series generally have a ridge on the falls of the flowers, similar to a crest.

They are not hardy in the UK and should be cultivated in an alpine house, with plenty of water during the growing months. 
Only 'Iris minutoaurea' has been cultivated in Britain.

The series has been analysed by C. A Wilson in 2009, and found to be polyphyletic.

Includes;
Iris henryi Baker
Iris koreana Nakai
Iris minutoaurea Makino
Iris odaesanensis Y.N.Lee
Iris proantha  Diels
Iris rossii Baker
Iris speculatrix Hance

References

Chinenses
Flora of Asia